Evaristo Muñoz Estarlich (1684, Valencia – 1737, Valencia) was a Spanish Baroque painter; a follower of the decorative style introduced to Valencia by Antonio Palomino. Some sources give his year of birth as 1671.

Biography 
He studied with Juan Conchillos and, in addition to his artwork, was known as a dancer, theatrical performer and fencer.

When the husband appeared, he had to return to Valencia, and served as a soldier along the way, although he continued to paint. Once again, he was offered marriage by a woman who said her husband had died in Sicily, but this time he was more cautious. He finally married María Teresa Llacer, a young woman who survived him by fifty years.

After that marriage, he settled permanently in Valencia, dedicating himself to painting and teaching, for which he maintained a private drawing school at his home. The well known artists who took classes at his school include Ignacio Vergara,  and Cristóbal Valero.

His works were numerous, although many have not survived.

Four canvases depicting the childhood of Jesus, which were deposited at the Museum during the Confiscation, were restored in 2010 and have been attributed to him. They were originally believed to be the work of Luca Giordano.

References

External links 

Santa Lucía, by David Vilaplana Zurita in La luz de las imágenes, Vol. II, 1999.

1684 births
1737 deaths
Painters from the Valencian Community
18th-century Spanish painters
18th-century Spanish male artists
Spanish male painters
Spanish Baroque painters